Eutreta rhinophora is a species of tephritid or fruit flies in the genus Eutreta of the family Tephritidae.

Distribution
Mexico, Colombia & Venezuela.

References

Tephritinae
Insects described in 1937
Diptera of South America
Diptera of North America